Thank You Very Much may refer to:

Songs 
 "Thank You Very Much" (Margaret song), 2013
 "Thank You Very Much", a song from Chaz Jankel's 1983 album Chazablanca
 "Thank You Very Much", a song from Kevin Ayers' 1992 album Still Life with Guitar
 "Thank You Very Much", a song from the 1970 musical film Scrooge
 "Thank U Very Much" (The Scaffold song), 1967
 "Thank U Very Much", a song by BESTie from their 2014 album Hot Baby

Albums 
 Thank You Very Much (album), a 1979 live album by Cliff Richard and the Shadows
 Thank You Very Much, a 1989 album by Rebecca Malope

Television Episodes
 Thank You Very Much, a 1999 episode of Relic Hunter

See also